Dayana M. Cadeau (born June 2, 1966) is a  Haitian Canadian professional female bodybuilder.

Early life and education
Cadeau was born in 1966 in Haiti. At the age of seven, she and her mom moved to Quebec City, Quebec, where she was raised. Her mom wanted her to learn English, so she was enrolled in a private Christian school.

Bodybuilding career

Amateur
Cadeau earned her pro card in 1997 by winning the overall title at the Canada Cup.

Professional

1997-2004
When the IFBB introduced weight classes in 2000, Cadeau first competed as a heavyweight at the 2000 Ms. International. Afterwards she competed as a lightweight.  During her pro career, her home country would appear as both Canada and the United States in the competition scorecard.  At the 2002 Ms. International, she again competed as a heavyweight. In the 2003 Ms. International, she competed as a lightweight, only to compete as a middleweight in the 2003 Jan Tana Classic. The year 2004 was her most successful year in the sport, with her winning the lightweight title in the Ms. International and Ms. Olympia.

2005-2011
She would place 2nd at Ms. Olympia from 2006 to 2008. She would remain in the top six in every IFBB pro-competition, with the exception of the 2009 Ms. International and 2011 Ms. International and 2011 Ms. Olympia.

Retirement
In 2011, Cadeau announced she is retiring from bodybuilding and joined physique.

Legacy
Currently, Cadeau is the most successful Canadian bodybuilder in the world, by being the only Canadian to win the Ms. Olympia lightweight. She is also the most successful bodybuilder of Haitian descent. She has never won an overall pro title, but she has four class titles to her credit—lightweight at the Ms. International in 2001 and 2004, middleweight at the 2003 Jan Tana Classic, and lightweight at the Ms. Olympia in 2004. From October 2009 to August 2013, she helped create and promote the NPC Dayana Cadeau Classic.

Competition history
1992 Quebec Metropolitan - 1st Overall
1993 IFBB Quebec Provincial - 1st (HW and Overall)
1994 CBBF Canadian Championship - 3rd (HW)
1995 IFBB Canada Cup - 4th (HW)
1996 CBBF Canadian Championship - 2nd (HW)
1996 IFBB North American - 2nd (HW)
1997 IFBB Canada Cup - 1st (HW and Overall)
1997 IFBB Jan Tana Classic - 11th
1998 IFBB Jan Tana Classic - 3rd
1998 IFBB Ms. Olympia - 14th
1999 IFBB Ms. International - 11th
1999 IFBB Jan Tana Classic - 9th
1999 IFBB Pro Extravaganza - 9th
2000 IFBB Ms. International - 7th (HW)
2000 IFBB Jan Tana Classic - 3rd (LW)
2001 IFBB Ms. International - 1st (LW)
2001 IFBB Ms. Olympia - 3rd (LW)
2002 IFBB Ms. International - 2nd (LW)
2002 IFBB Ms. Olympia - 5th (HW)
2003 IFBB Ms. International - 4th (LW)
2003 IFBB Jan Tana Classic - 1st (MW)
2003 IFBB Ms. Olympia - 2nd (LW)
2004 IFBB Ms. International - 1st (LW)
2004 IFBB Ms. Olympia - 1st (LW)
2005 IFBB Ms. Olympia - 3rd
2006 IFBB Ms. International - 2nd
2006 IFBB Ms. Olympia - 2nd
2007 IFBB Ms. International - 6th
2007 IFBB Ms. Olympia - 2nd
2008 IFBB Ms. International - 2nd
2008 IFBB Ms. Olympia - 2nd
2009 IFBB Ms. International - 5th
2009 IFBB Ms. Olympia - 8th
2010 IFBB Ms. International - 6th
2010 IFBB Ms. Olympia - 5th
2011 IFBB Ms. International - 9th
2011 IFBB Ms. Olympia - 16th

Best statistics

 Bench press -  for a rep
 Bust/waist/hip measurements - ,  and 
 Chest - 
 Height - 
 On season weight:
  (2002)
  (2003 Jana Tana Classic)
  (2003 Ms. Olympia)
  (2004 Ms. International)
  (2004 Ms. Olympia)
  (2005 Ms. Olympia)
  (7 May 2006)
  (2008)
  (2008 Ms. International)
  (2010)
  (23 September 2010)

Physique career

Competition history
2012 IFBB New York Pro - 16th
2012 IFBB Tampa Pro - 15th

Personal life
Cadeau currently lives in Wilton Manors, Florida. She is a Christian. She speaks Haitian Creole, French, and English. Besides being a professional bodybuilder and physique contestant, she works as a legal assistant, promoter, NPC judge, adult model, and personal trainer. In January 2008, she founded the Dayana M. Cadeau Inc.

References

External links
Official web site
Dayana Cadeau Photos

| colspan = 3 align = center | Ms. Olympia 
|- 
| width = 30% align = center | Preceded by:Juliette Bergmann
| width = 40% align = center | First (2004)
| width = 30% align = center | Succeeded by:None

| colspan = 3 align = center | Ms. International 
|- 
| width = 30% align = center | Preceded by:Brenda Raganot
| width = 40% align = center | First (2001)
| width = 30% align = center | Succeeded by:Valentina Chepiga
|- 
| width = 30% align = center | Preceded by:Cathy LeFrançois
| width = 40% align = center | Second (2004)
| width = 30% align = center | Succeeded by:Brenda Raganot

1966 births
Haitian female bodybuilders
Haitian sportspeople
Living people
Professional bodybuilders